Katariina Tuohimaa (born 28 April 1988 in Helsinki) is a Finnish former tennis player.

In her career, Tuohimaa won five doubles titles on the ITF Women's Circuit. On 13 August 2007, she reached her best singles ranking of world No. 730. On the same date, she peaked at No. 481 in the doubles rankings.

Tuohimaa played six rubbers for Finland at the 2006 Fed Cup.

ITF finals (5–4)

Singles (0–1)

Doubles (5–3)

Fed Cup participation

Singles

Doubles

References
 
 
 

1988 births
Living people
Sportspeople from Helsinki
Finnish female tennis players
TCU Horned Frogs women's tennis players
College women's tennis players in the United States
20th-century Finnish women
21st-century Finnish women